Ankhefensekhmet (ˁnḫ=f n sḫm.t; "He lives for Sekhmet") was a High Priest of Ptah during the 21st Dynasty in Egypt. He probably served during the reign of Psusennes II and maybe the reign of Shoshenq I.

Ankhefensekhmet is known from a genealogy known as Berlin 23673, which was made by his namesake descendant during the late 22nd Dynasty. On it, he is said to be a prophet (hm nTr). He is also mentioned in a genealogy from the Louvre where he is said to be a High Priest of Ptah.

Ankhefensekhmet is known to have married the Lady Tapeshenese, who served as the First Chief of the Harem of Ptah and Prophetess of Mut. She was the mother of his successor Shedsu-nefertum.

References

Bibliography 
L. Borchardt, Die Mittel zur Zeitlichen Festlegung von Punkten de Aegyptischen Geschichte und ihre Anwendung, 1935, pg 96-112
E. Chassinat, Recueil de travaux relatifs à la philologie et à l'archéologie égyptiennes et assyriennes, 22 (1900) 16-17, No 54
Malinines, Posner, Vercoutter, Catalogue des steles de Sérapéum de Memphis, I, 1968, No. 52, pp. 48–49
Kees, Zeitschrift fur Agyptischer Sprache, 87 (1962), 146-9

Ancient Egyptian priests
Memphis High Priests of Ptah
People of the Twenty-first Dynasty of Egypt
People of the Twenty-second Dynasty of Egypt
10th-century BC clergy